WANdisco, plc., dually headquartered in Sheffield, England and San Ramon, California in the US, is a public software company specialized in the area of distributed computing. It has development offices in San Ramon, California; Sheffield, England; and Belfast, Northern Ireland.  WANdisco is a corporate contributor to Hadoop, Subversion and other open source projects. On 9 March 2023, the company's shares were suspended from trading in London, citing potentially fraudulent irregularities.

History
The name WANdisco is an acronym for wide area network distributed computing. Initially offering a replication solution for distributed teams using the Concurrent Versions System (CVS), this was expanded to include Apache Subversion with SVN MultiSite Plus in 2006, Git with Git MultiSite in 2013 and Gerrit with Gerrit MultiSite in 2014.

In 2012, WANdisco acquired AltoStor, and entered the Big Data market with its Non-Stop Hadoop product. AltoStor's founders, Dr. Konstantin Shvachko and Jagane Sundar, joined WANdisco as part of the acquisition, and helped develop the company's next generation Hadoop product released in 2015, WANdisco Fusion.

Technology
WANdisco's Distributed Coordination Engine (DConE) is the shared component for WANdisco clustering products. The DConE system allows multiple instances of the same application to operate on independent hardware without sharing any resources. All of the application servers are kept in synchronisation by DConE regardless of whether the servers are on the same LAN or globally separated and accessible only over a wide area network (WAN).

WANdisco's replication technology was the work of Yeturu Aahlad, who had previously worked for Sun, Netscape and IBM, and was involved in developing the CORBA Framework. Aahlad theorized a model for effective Active replication over a WAN. In the development of DConE, WANdisco has taken the Paxos algorithm as a baseline and added innovations relevant to mission-critical, high transaction volume distributed environments.

WANdisco provides replication products for  CVS, Apache Subversion, Git, Gerrit, Apache Hadoop, Amazon Web Services, Microsoft Azure, Google Cloud Platform. In addition, the company offers support, consultancy and training services.

The company's website lists companies such as ARM, Avaya, Bally Technologies, Barclays, BlackRock, Bosch, Cisco, Dell EMC, Disney, Fujitsu, General Electric, Honda, Juniper Networks and Pitney Bowes.

IBM OEM
In April 2016, WANdisco announced that IBM had signed a deal to OEM WANdisco Fusion.  The deal allows IBM to rebrand Fusion as "IBM Big Replicate" and plays an important role in the IBM Big Data and Cloud Computing strategy, including movement of data between on-premises software and Cloud.

Blockchain
In July 2018, WANdisco announced that it had filed a new patent in Blockchain. The company claims that the patent "enables effective permissioned blockchain transactions with an underlying algorithmic mechanism. This mechanism enables throughput to be achieved that is orders of magnitude higher than public blockchains."

Defunct products
In 2011 WANdisco announced uberSVN, a deployment of Apache Subversion which included a web based management console and the ability to add additional application lifecycle management features. The uberSVN download was available through mid-2013.

Open source contributions
In September 2013 WANdisco announced it is an official sponsor of the UC Berkeley AMPLab, a five-year collaborative effort at the University of California, Berkeley.

Hadoop
WANdisco has one Apache Hadoop committer on staff: Jagane Sundar.
In February 2013 WANdisco released a free distribution of Hadoop containing additional components developed by WANdisco.

Subversion
WANdisco was involved in the Apache Subversion open source project from 2008 through 2015. They employed several contributors to work on the Subversion project during that time.

Server and client binaries
WANdisco provides Subversion binary downloads for Windows, CentOS, Debian, Oracle Linux, RHEL, SUSE Linux, Ubuntu, Mac OS X and Solaris via its website. These binaries use the default package management system for each Linux distribution.

Project announcements
In December 2010, WANdisco announced its intention to develop some features for the Subversion project, specifically aimed at improving branching and merging functionality.

The Apache Foundation and some Subversion developers said  the announcement contained unfounded claims and insinuations about community involvement and the lack of development on these features. According to Apache, these features were already being worked on at the time. David Richards from WANdisco clarified this position to the Subversion community and followed up by announcing WANdisco's sponsorship and ongoing support for the work of the Apache Software Foundation.

Share suspension

On 9 March 2023, the company's shares were suspended from trading in London, citing potentially fraudulent irregularities. The company said it expected revenue for 2022 could be as low as $9 million compared to its previous guide of $24 million.

References

External links
 WANdisco web site

Software companies of England
Software companies based in the San Francisco Bay Area
Companies based in San Ramon, California
Software companies established in 2005
2005 establishments in California
Companies listed on the Alternative Investment Market
Companies based in Sheffield
Big data companies
Cloud computing providers
Hadoop
2012 initial public offerings
Software companies of the United States